Ichiban is Japanese for number one and may refer to:

"Ichiban", a song in the A–Z Series by Ash
Ichi-Ban, an album by the Louis Hayes – Junior Cook Quintet
Ichiban Records, an Atlanta, Georgia hip-hop record label
Chūka Ichiban!, a Japanese anime
Sapporo Ichiban, a brand of instant noodles produced by Sanyo Foods

See also